Televizija Herceg-Bosne ( locally known just as RTVHB) is a Bosnian public TV channel operated by RTVHB. The radio and television program is mainly produced in Croatian. This television channel broadcasts a variety of programs such as news, talk shows, documentaries, sports, movies, children's programs, etc.

Line-up

News program
 Dnevnik - Main news program broadcast every night at 19:30 with live reports, guest interviews and weather forecasts
 Vijesti - News at 17:00
 Zrcalo tjedna - Review of the weekly events

Documentary/talk shows
 Kompas - Political night talk show
 Fokus - Talk show

Sports program
 Sprint - Sport news
 Portret prvaka - Interviews with sportspeople

See also

Radiotelevizija Herceg-Bosne
Radio Televizija Republike Srpske
RTVFBiH

External links

References

Mass media in Mostar
Publicly funded broadcasters
Television stations in Bosnia and Herzegovina
Television channels and stations established in 1992
Radiotelevizija Herceg-Bosne